Rococo, less commonly Roccoco (or ), also known as Late Baroque, is an exceptionally ornamental and theatrical style of architecture, art and decoration which combines asymmetry, scrolling curves, gilding, white and pastel colours, sculpted moulding, and trompe-l'œil frescoes to create surprise and the illusion of motion and drama. It is often described as the final expression of the Baroque movement.

The Rococo style began in France in the 1730s as a reaction against the more formal and geometric Louis XIV style. It was known as the "style Rocaille", or "Rocaille style". It soon spread to other parts of Europe, particularly northern Italy, Austria, southern Germany, Central Europe and Russia. It also came to influence the other arts, particularly sculpture, furniture, silverware, glassware, painting, music, and theatre. Although originally a secular style primarily used for interiors of private residences, the Rococo had a spiritual aspect to it which led to its widespread use in church interiors, particularly in Central Europe, Portugal, and South America.

Etymology
 
The word rococo was first used as a humorous variation of the word rocaille. Rocaille was originally a method of decoration, using pebbles, seashells, and cement, which was often used to decorate grottoes and fountains since the Renaissance. In the late 17th and early 18th century, rocaille became the term for a kind of decorative motif or ornament that appeared in the late Style Louis XIV, in the form of a seashell interlaced with acanthus leaves. In 1736 the designer and jeweler Jean Mondon published the Premier Livre de forme rocquaille et cartel, a collection of designs for ornaments of furniture and interior decoration. It was the first appearance in print of the term rocaille to designate the style. The carved or moulded seashell motif was combined with palm leaves or twisting vines to decorate doorways, furniture, wall panels and other architectural elements.

The term rococo was first used in print in 1825 to describe decoration which was "out of style and old-fashioned". It was used in 1828 for decoration "which belonged to the style of the 18th century, overloaded with twisting ornaments". In 1829, the author Stendhal described rococo as "the rocaille style of the 18th century". 
 	
 
In the 19th century, the term was used to describe architecture or music which was excessively ornamental. Since the mid-19th century, the term has been accepted by art historians. While there is still some debate about the historical significance of the style, Rococo is now often considered as a distinct period in the development of European art.

Characteristics
Rococo features exuberant decoration, with an abundance of curves, counter-curves, undulations and elements modeled on nature. The exteriors of Rococo buildings are often simple, while the interiors are entirely dominated by their ornament. The style was highly theatrical, designed to impress and awe at first sight. Floor plans of churches were often complex, featuring interlocking ovals; In palaces, grand stairways became centrepieces, and offered different points of view of the decoration. The main ornaments of Rococo are: asymmetrical shells, acanthus and other leaves, birds, bouquets of flowers, fruit, musical instruments, angels and Chinoiserie (pagodas, dragons, monkeys, bizarre flowers and Chinese people).

The style often integrated painting, moulded stucco, and wood carving, and quadratura, or illusionist ceiling paintings, which were designed to give the impression that those entering the room were looking up at the sky, where cherubs and other figures were gazing down at them. Materials used included stucco, either painted or left white; combinations of different coloured woods (usually oak, beech or walnut); lacquered wood in the Japanese style, ornament of gilded bronze, and marble tops of commodes or tables. The intent was to create an impression of surprise, awe and wonder on first view.

Differences between Baroque and Rococo
Rococo has the following characteristics, which Baroque does not:

The partial abandonment of symmetry, everything being composed of graceful lines and curves, similar to Art Nouveau
The huge quantity of asymmetrical curves and C-shaped volutes
The wide use of flowers in ornamentation, an example being festoons made of flowers
Chinese and Japanese motifs (see also: chinoiserie and Japonisme)
Warm pastel colours (whitish-yellow, cream-coloured, pearl greys, very light blues)

France

The Rocaille style, or French Rococo, appeared in Paris during the reign of Louis XV, and flourished between about 1723 and 1759. The style was used particularly in salons, a new style of room designed to impress and entertain guests. The most prominent example was the salon of the Princess in Hôtel de Soubise in Paris, designed by Germain Boffrand and Charles-Joseph Natoire (1735–40). The characteristics of French Rococo included exceptional artistry, especially in the complex frames made for mirrors and paintings, which were sculpted in plaster and often gilded; and the use of vegetal forms (vines, leaves, flowers) intertwined in complex designs. The furniture also featured sinuous curves and vegetal designs. The leading furniture designers and craftsmen in the style included Juste-Aurele Meissonier, Charles Cressent, and Nicolas Pineau.

The Rocaille style lasted in France until the mid-18th century, and while it became more curving and vegetal, it never achieved the extravagant exuberance of the Rococo in Bavaria, Austria and Italy. The discoveries of Roman antiquities beginning in 1738 at Herculaneum and especially at Pompeii in 1748 turned French architecture in the direction of the more symmetrical and less flamboyant neo-classicism.

Italy
Artists in Italy, particularly Venice, also produced an exuberant rococo style. Venetian commodes imitated the curving lines and carved ornament of the French rocaille, but with a particular Venetian variation; the pieces were painted, often with landscapes or flowers or scenes from Guardi or other painters, or Chinoiserie, against a blue or green background, matching the colours of the Venetian school of painters whose work decorated the salons. Notable decorative painters included Giovanni Battista Tiepolo, who painted ceilings and murals of both churches and palazzos, and Giovanni Battista Crosato who painted the ballroom ceiling of the Ca Rezzonico in the quadraturo manner, giving the illusion of three dimensions. Tiepelo travelled to Germany with his son during 1752–1754, decorating the ceilings of the Würzburg Residence, one of the major landmarks of the Bavarian rococo. An earlier celebrated Venetian painter was Giovanni Battista Piazzetta, who painted several notable church ceilings.

The Venetian Rococo also featured exceptional glassware, particularly Murano glass, often engraved and coloured, which was exported across Europe. Works included multicolour chandeliers and mirrors with extremely ornate frames.

Southern Germany

In church construction, especially in the southern German-Austrian region, gigantic spatial creations are sometimes created for practical reasons alone, which, however, do not appear monumental, but are characterized by a unique fusion of architecture, painting, stucco, etc., often eliminating the boundaries between the art genres, and are characterised by a light-filled weightlessness, festive cheerfulness and movement.
The Rococo decorative style reached its summit in southern Germany and Austria from the 1730s until the 1770s. There it dominates the church landscape to this day and is deeply anchored there in popular culture. It was first introduced from France through the publications and works of French architects and decorators, including the sculptor Claude III Audran, the interior designer Gilles-Marie Oppenordt, the architect Germain Boffrand, the sculptor Jean Mondon, and the draftsman and engraver Pierre Lepautre. Their work had an important influence on the German Rococo style, but does not reach the level of buildings in southern Germany.

German architects adapted the Rococo style but made it far more asymmetric and loaded with more ornate decoration than the French original. The German style was characterized by an explosion of forms that cascaded down the walls. It featured molding formed into curves and counter-curves, twisting and turning patterns, ceilings and walls with no right angles, and stucco foliage which seemed to be creeping up the walls and across the ceiling. The decoration was often gilded or silvered to give it contrast with the white or pale pastel walls.

The Belgian-born architect and designer François de Cuvilliés was one of the first to create a Rococo building in Germany, with the pavilion of Amalienburg in Munich, (1734-1739), inspired by the pavilions of the Trianon and Marly in France. It was built as a hunting lodge, with a platform on the roof for shooting pheasants. The Hall of Mirrors in the interior, by the painter and stucco sculptor Johann Baptist Zimmermann, was far more exuberant than any French Rococo.

Another notable example of the early German Rococo is Würzburg Residence (1737–1744) constructed for the Prince-Bishop of Würzburg by Balthasar Neumann. Neumann had travelled to Paris and consulted with the French rocaille decorative artists Germain Boffrand and Robert de Cotte. While the exterior was in more sober Baroque style, the interior, particularly the stairways and ceilings, was much lighter and decorative. The Prince-Bishop imported the Italian Rococo painter Giovanni Battista Tiepolo in 1750–1753 to create a mural over the top of the three-level ceremonial stairway. Neumann described the interior of the residence as "a theatre of light". The stairway was also the central element in a residence Neumann built at the Augustusburg Palace in Brühl (1743–1748). In that building the stairway led the visitors up through a stucco fantasy of paintings, sculpture, ironwork and decoration, with surprising views at every turn.

In the 1740s and 1750s, a number of notable pilgrimage churches were constructed in Bavaria, with interiors decorated in a distinctive variant of the rococo style. One of the most notable examples is the Wieskirche (1745–1754) designed by Dominikus Zimmermann. Like most of the Bavarian pilgrimage churches, the exterior is very simple, with pastel walls, and little ornament. Entering the church the visitor encounters an astonishing theatre of movement and light. It features an oval-shaped sanctuary, and a deambulatory in the same form, filling in the church with light from all sides. The white walls contrasted with columns of blue and pink stucco in the choir, and the domed ceiling surrounded by plaster angels below a dome representing the heavens crowded with colourful Biblical figures. Other notable pilgrimage churches include the Basilica of the Fourteen Holy Helpers by Balthasar Neumann (1743–1772).

Johann Michael Fischer was the architect of Ottobeuren Abbey (1748–1766), another Bavarian Rococo landmark. The church features, like much of the rococo architecture in Germany, a remarkable contrast between the regularity of the facade and the overabundance of decoration in the interior.

Britain
In Great Britain, rococo was called the "French taste" and had less influence on design and the decorative arts than in continental Europe, although its influence was felt in such areas as silverwork, porcelain, and silks. William Hogarth helped develop a theoretical foundation for Rococo beauty. Though not mentioning rococo by name, he argued in his Analysis of Beauty (1753) that the undulating lines and S-curves prominent in Rococo were the basis for grace and beauty in art or nature (unlike the straight line or the circle in Classicism).

Rococo was slow in arriving in England. Before entering the Rococo, British furniture for a time followed the neoclassical Palladian model under designer William Kent, who designed for Lord Burlington and other important patrons of the arts. Kent travelled to Italy with Lord Burlington between 1712 and 1720, and brought back many models and ideas from Palladio. He designed the furniture for Hampton Court Palace (1732), Lord Burlington's Chiswick House (1729), London, Thomas Coke's Holkham Hall, Norfolk, Robert Walpole's pile at Houghton, for Devonshire House in London, and at Rousham.

Mahogany made its appearance in England in about 1720, and immediately became popular for furniture, along with walnut wood. The Rococo began to make an appearance in England between 1740 and 1750. The furniture of Thomas Chippendale was the closest to the Rococo style, In 1754 he published "Gentleman's and Cabinet-makers' directory", a catalogue of designs for rococo, chinoiserie and even Gothic furniture, which achieved wide popularity, going through three editions. Unlike French designers, Chippendale did not employ marquetry or inlays in his furniture. The predominant designer of inlaid furniture were Vile and Cob, the cabinet-makers for King George III. Another important figure in British furniture was Thomas Johnson, who in 1761, very late in the period, published a catalogue of Rococo furniture designs. These include furnishings based on rather fantastic Chinese and Indian motifs, including a canopy bed crowned by a Chinese pagoda (now in the Victoria and Albert Museum).

Other notable figures in the British Rococo included the silversmith Charles Friedrich Kandler.

Russia
The Russian Empress Catherine the Great was another admirer of the Rococo; The Golden Cabinet of the Chinese Palace in the palace complex of Oranienbaum near Saint Petersburg, designed by the Italian Antonio Rinaldi, is an example of the Russian Rococo.

Frederician Rococo

Frederician Rococo is a form of Rococo which developed in Prussia during the reign of Frederick the Great and combined influences from France, Germany (especially Saxony) and the Netherlands. Its most famous adherent was the architect Georg Wenzeslaus von Knobelsdorff. Furthermore, the painter Antoine Pesne and even King Frederick himself influenced Knobelsdorff's designs. Famous buildings in the Frederican style include Sanssouci Palace, the Potsdam City Palace, and parts of Charlottenburg Palace.

Decline and end

The art of Boucher and other painters of the period, with its emphasis on decorative mythology and gallantry, soon inspired a reaction, and a demand for more "noble" themes. While the Rococo continued in Germany and Austria, the French Academy in Rome began to teach the classic style. This was confirmed by the nomination of De Troy as director of the academy in 1738, and then in 1751 by Charles-Joseph Natoire.

Madame de Pompadour, the mistress of Louis XV contributed to the decline of the Rococo style. In 1750 she sent her brother, Abel-François Poisson de Vandières, on a two-year mission to study artistic and archeological developments in Italy. He was accompanied by several artists, including the engraver Charles-Nicolas Cochin and the architect Soufflot. They returned to Paris with a passion for classical art. Vandiéres became the Marquis of Marigny, and was named director general of the King's Buildings. He turned official French architecture toward the neoclassical. Cochin became an important art critic; he denounced the petit style of Boucher, and called for a grand style with a new emphasis on antiquity and nobility in the academies of painting and architecture.

The beginning of the end for Rococo came in the early 1760s as figures like Voltaire and Jacques-François Blondel began to voice their criticism of the superficiality and degeneracy of the art. Blondel decried the "ridiculous jumble of shells, dragons, reeds, palm-trees and plants" in contemporary interiors.

By 1785, Rococo had passed out of fashion in France, replaced by the order and seriousness of Neoclassical artists like Jacques-Louis David. In Germany, late 18th-century Rococo was ridiculed as Zopf und Perücke ("pigtail and periwig"), and this phase is sometimes referred to as Zopfstil. Rococo remained popular in certain German provincial states and in Italy, until the second phase of neoclassicism, "Empire style", arrived with Napoleonic governments and swept Rococo away.

Furniture and decoration
The ornamental style called rocaille emerged in France between 1710 and 1750, mostly during the regency and reign of Louis XV; the style was also called Louis Quinze. Its principal characteristics were picturesque detail, curves and counter-curves, asymmetry, and a theatrical exuberance. On the walls of new Paris salons, the twisting and winding designs, usually made of gilded or painted stucco, wound around the doorways and mirrors like vines. One of the earliest examples was the Hôtel Soubise in Paris (1704–05), with its famous oval salon decorated with paintings by Boucher, and Charles-Joseph Natoire.

The best known French furniture designer of the period was Juste-Aurèle Meissonnier (1695–1750), who was also a sculptor, painter. and goldsmith for the royal household. He held the title of official designer to the Chamber and Cabinet of Louis XV. His work is well known today because of the enormous number of engravings made of his work which popularized the style throughout Europe. He designed works for the royal families of Poland and Portugal.

Italy was another place where the Rococo flourished, both in its early and later phases. Craftsmen in Rome, Milan and Venice all produced lavishly decorated furniture and decorative items.

The sculpted decoration included fleurettes, palmettes, seashells, and foliage, carved in wood. The most extravagant rocaille forms were found in the consoles, tables designed to stand against walls. The Commodes, or chests, which had first appeared under Louis XIV, were richly decorated with rocaille ornament made of gilded bronze. They were made by master craftsmen including Jean-Pierre Latz and also featured marquetry of different-coloured woods, sometimes placed in draughtsboard cubic patterns, made with light and dark woods. The period also saw the arrival of Chinoiserie, often in the form of lacquered and gilded commodes, called falcon de Chine of Vernis Martin, after the ebenist who introduced the technique to France. Ormolu, or gilded bronze, was used by master craftsmen including Jean-Pierre Latz. Latz made a particularly ornate clock mounted atop a cartonnier for Frederick the Great for his palace in Potsdam. Pieces of imported Chinese porcelain were often mounted in ormolu (gilded bronze) rococo settings for display on tables or consoles in salons. Other craftsmen imitated the Japanese art of lacquered furniture, and produced commodes with Japanese motifs.

British Rococo tended to be more restrained. Thomas Chippendale's furniture designs kept the curves and feel, but stopped short of the French heights of whimsy. The most successful exponent of British Rococo was probably Thomas Johnson, a gifted carver and furniture designer working in London in the mid-18th century.

Painting
Elements of the Rocaille style appeared in the work of some French painters, including a taste for the picturesque in details; curves and counter-curves; and dissymmetry which replaced the movement of the baroque with exuberance, though the French rocaille never reached the extravagance of the Germanic rococo. The leading proponent was Antoine Watteau, particularly in Pilgrimage on the Isle of Cythera (1717), Louvre, in a genre called Fête Galante depicting scenes of young nobles gathered together to celebrate in a pastoral setting. Watteau died in 1721 at the age of thirty-seven, but his work continued to have influence through the rest of the century. The Pilgrimage to Cythera painting was purchased by Frederick the Great of Prussia in 1752 or 1765 to decorate his palace of Charlottenburg in Berlin.

The successor of Watteau and the Féte Galante in decorative painting was François Boucher (1703–1770), the favorite painter of Madame de Pompadour. His work included the sensual Toilette de Venus (1746), which became one of the best known examples of the style. Boucher participated in all of the genres of the time, designing tapestries, models for porcelain sculpture, set decorations for the Paris opera and opera-comique, and decor for the Fair of Saint-Laurent.  Other important painters of the Fête Galante style included Nicolas Lancret and Jean-Baptiste Pater. The style particularly influenced François Lemoyne, who painted the lavish decoration of the ceiling of the Salon of Hercules at the Palace of Versailles, completed in 1735. Paintings with fétes gallant and mythological themes by Boucher, Pierre-Charles Trémolières and Charles-Joseph Natoire decorated the famous salon of the Hôtel Soubise in Paris (1735–40). Other Rococo painters include: Jean François de Troy (1679–1752), Jean-Baptiste van Loo (1685–1745), his two sons Louis-Michel van Loo (1707–1771) and Charles-Amédée-Philippe van Loo (1719–1795), his younger brother Charles-André van Loo (1705–1765), Nicolas Lancret (1690–1743), and Jean Honoré Fragonard (1732-1806).

In Austria and Southern Germany, Italian painting had the largest effect on the Rococo style. The Venetian painter Giovanni Battista Tiepolo, assisted by his son, Giovanni Domenico Tiepolo, was invited to paint frescoes for the Würzburg Residence (1720–1744). The most prominent painter of Bavarian rococo churches was Johann Baptist Zimmermann, who painted the ceiling of the Wieskirche (1745–1754).

Sculpture

Rococo sculpture was theatrical, colourful and dynamic, giving a sense of movement in every direction. It was most commonly found in the interiors of churches, usually closely integrated with painting and the architecture. Religious sculpture followed the Italian baroque style, as exemplified in the theatrical altarpiece of the Karlskirche in Vienna.

Early Rococo or Rocaille sculpture in France sculpture was lighter and offered more movement than the classical style of Louis XIV. It was encouraged in particular by Madame de Pompadour, mistress of Louis XV, who commissioned many works for her chateaux and gardens. The sculptor Edmé Bouchardon represented Cupid engaged in carving his darts of love from the club of Hercules. Rococo figures also crowded the later fountains at Versailles, such as the Fountain of Neptune by Lambert-Sigisbert Adam and Nicolas-Sebastien Adam (1740). Based on their success at Versailles, they were invited to Prussia by Frederick the Great to create fountain sculpture for Sanssouci Palace, Prussia (1740s).

Étienne-Maurice Falconet (1716–1791) was another leading French sculptor during the period. Falconet was most famous for his statue of Peter the Great on horseback in St. Petersburg, but he also created a series of smaller works for wealthy collectors, which could be reproduced in a series in terracotta or cast in bronze. The French sculptors, Jean-Louis Lemoyne, Jean-Baptiste Lemoyne, Louis-Simon Boizot, Michel Clodion, Lambert-Sigisbert Adam and Jean-Baptiste Pigalle all produced sculpture in series for collectors.

In Italy, Antonio Corradini was among the leading sculptors of the Rococo style. A Venetian, he travelled around Europe, working for Peter the Great in St. Petersburg, for the imperial courts in Austria and Naples. He preferred sentimental themes and made several skilled works of women with faces covered by veils, one of which is now in the Louvre.

The most elaborate examples of rococo sculpture were found in Spain, Austria and southern Germany, in the decoration of palaces and churches. The sculpture was closely integrated with the architecture; it was impossible to know where one stopped and the other began. In the Belvedere Palace in Vienna, (1721-1722), the vaulted ceiling of the Hall of the Atlantes is held up on the shoulders of muscular figures designed by Johann Lukas von Hildebrandt. The portal of the Palace of the Marquis of Dos Aguas in Valencia (1715-1776) was completely drenched in sculpture carved in marble, from designs by Hipolito Rovira Brocandel.

The El Transparente altar, in the major chapel of Toledo Cathedral is a towering sculpture of polychrome marble and gilded stucco, combined with paintings, statues and symbols. It was made by Narciso Tomé (1721–32), Its design allows light to pass through, and in changing light it seems to move.

Porcelain
A new form of small-scale sculpture appeared, the porcelain figure, or small group of figures, initially replacing sugar sculptures on grand dining room tables, but soon popular for placing on mantelpieces and furniture. The number of European factories grew steadily through the century, and some made porcelain that the expanding middle classes could afford. The amount of colourful overglaze decoration used on them also increased. They were usually modelled by artists who had trained in sculpture. Common subjects included figures from the commedia dell'arte, city street vendors, lovers and figures in fashionable clothes, and pairs of birds.

Johann Joachim Kändler was the most important modeller of Meissen porcelain, the earliest European factory, which remained the most important until about 1760. The Swiss-born German sculptor Franz Anton Bustelli produced a wide variety of colourful figures for the Nymphenburg Porcelain Manufactory in Bavaria, which were sold throughout Europe. The French sculptor Étienne-Maurice Falconet (1716–1791) followed this example. While also making large-scale works, he became director of the Sevres Porcelain manufactory and produced small-scale works, usually about love and gaiety, for production in series.

Music
A Rococo period existed in music history, although it is not as well known as the earlier Baroque and later Classical forms. The Rococo music style itself developed out of baroque music both in France, where the new style was referred to as style galant ("gallant" or "elegant" style), and in Germany, where it was referred to as empfindsamer Stil ("sensitive style"). It can be characterized as light, intimate music with extremely elaborate and refined forms of ornamentation. Exemplars include Jean Philippe Rameau, Louis-Claude Daquin and François Couperin in France; in Germany, the style's main proponents were C. P. E. Bach and Johann Christian Bach, two sons of J.S. Bach.

In the second half of the 18th century, a reaction against the Rococo style occurred, primarily against its perceived overuse of ornamentation and decoration. Led by Christoph Willibald Gluck, this reaction ushered in the Classical era. By the early 19th century, Catholic opinion had turned against the suitability of the style for ecclesiastical contexts because it was "in no way conducive to sentiments of devotion".

Russian composer of the Romantic era Pyotr Ilyich Tchaikovsky wrote The Variations on a Rococo Theme, Op. 33, for cello and orchestra in 1877. Although the theme is not Rococo in origin, it is written in Rococo style.

Fashion 

Rococo fashion was based on extravagance, elegance, refinement and decoration. Women's fashion of the seventeenth-century was contrasted by the fashion of the eighteenth-century, which was ornate and sophisticated, the true style of Rococo. 
These fashions spread beyond the royal court into the salons and cafés of the ascendant bourgeoisie. The exuberant, playful, elegant style of decoration and design that we now know to be 'Rococo' was then known as le style rocaille, le style moderne, le gout.

A style that appeared in the early eighteenth-century was the robe volante, a flowing gown, that became popular towards the end of King Louis XIV's reign. This gown had the features of a bodice with large pleats flowing down the back to the ground over a rounded petticoat. The colour palette was rich, dark fabrics accompanied by elaborate, heavy design features. After the death of Louis XIV the clothing styles began to change. The fashion took a turn to a lighter, more frivolous style, transitioning from the baroque period to the well-known style of Rococo. The later period was known for their pastel colours, more revealing frocks, and the plethora of frills, ruffles, bows, and lace as trims. Shortly after the typical women's Rococo gown was introduced, robe à la Française, a gown with a tight bodice that had a low cut neckline, usually with a large ribbon bows down the centre front, wide panniers, and was lavishly trimmed in large amounts of lace, ribbon, and flowers.

The Watteau pleats also became more popular, named after the painter Jean-Antoine Watteau, who painted the details of the gowns down to the stitches of lace and other trimmings with immense accuracy. Later, the 'pannier' and 'mantua' became fashionable around 1718. They were wide hoops under the dress to extend the hips out sideways and they soon became a staple in formal wear. This gave the Rococo period the iconic dress of wide hips combined with the large amount of decoration on the garments. These features originally came from seventeenth-century Spanish fashion, known as guardainfante, initially designed to hide the pregnant stomach, then reimagined later as the pannier. 1745 became the Golden Age of the Rococo with the introduction of a more exotic, oriental culture in France called a la turque. This was made popular by Louis XV's mistress, Madame Pompadour, who commissioned the artist, Charles Andre Van Loo, to paint her as a Turkish sultana.

In the 1760s, a style of less formal dresses emerged and one of these was the polonaise, with inspiration taken from Poland. It was shorter than the French dress, allowing the underskirt and ankles to be seen, which made it easier to move around in. Another dress that came into fashion was the robe a l'anglais, which included elements inspired by the males' fashion; a short jacket, broad lapels and long sleeves. It also had a snug bodice, a full skirt without panniers but still a little long in the back to form a small train, and often some type of lace kerchief worn around the neck. Another piece was the 'redingote', halfway between a cape and an overcoat.

Accessories were also important to all women during this time, as they added to the opulence and the decor of the body to match their gowns. At any official ceremony ladies were required to cover their hands and arms with gloves if their clothes were sleeveless.

Gallery

Architecture

Engravings

Painting

Rococo era painting

See also

 Italian Rococo art
 Rococo painting
 Rococo in Portugal
 Rococo in Spain
 Cultural movement
 Gilded woodcarving
 History of painting
 Timeline of Italian artists to 1800
 Illusionistic ceiling painting
 Louis XV style
 Louis XV furniture

Notes and citations

Bibliography

 (French translation from German)

Further reading

 
 Arno Schönberger and Halldor Soehner, 1960. The Age of Rococo. Published in the US as The Rococo Age: Art and Civilization of the 18th Century (Originally published in German, 1959).

External links

 All-art.org: Rococo in the "History of Art"
 
 History of Rococo. Art, architecture & luxury  History & Culture Academy of Latgale
 Bergerfoundation.ch: Rococo style examples
 Barock- und Rococo- Architektur, Volume 1, Part 1, 1892(in German) Kenneth Franzheim II Rare Books Room, William R. Jenkins Architecture and Art Library, University of Houston Digital Library.

 
 

18th century in art
18th century in the arts
Art movements
Art movements in Europe
Catholic art by period
Decorative arts
Early Modern period